Gene Simmons Family Jewels is an American reality television series that premiered on A&E on August 7, 2006 and ended on July 14, 2012. It follows Kiss bassist and vocalist Gene Simmons, his longtime partner and wife Shannon Tweed, and their two children, Nick and Sophie.

"It is very much like The Osbournes," Simmons noted. "But I believe that people will see us on television and see how I run things and the rules I make, and they'll think, 'Put that guy in charge!'"

Although it is presented as a reality series, some events shown did not actually occur. One of these was in the finale of Season 3: the viewer is led to believe Gene purchased the Australian Football team Carlton Football Club. In reality, there is no record of the team being sold to him. Additionally, the episode shows Simmons convincing Brendan Fevola to join Carlton Football Club, while in reality Fevola had been playing for Carlton since he was drafted in 1998. Other events include casting biker extras, as well as a bit actor in the show.

Prior to the third season, the series was the second highest rated series on A&E, behind Dog the Bounty Hunter. In Australia, the series is shown on The Biography Channel every Wednesday at 8:30 pm on Foxtel and Austar. It is also shown on the free to air channel 7mate.  The first three seasons were played back to back ending on April 1, 2009. Seasons 1-5 have been released on DVD.  Season 6 premiered on June 14, 2011 on A&E with the episode "Breaking Up Is Hard To Do." In addition to relationship troubles between Simmons and Tweed, that culminated in the two marrying, the season shows Simmons' March 2011 visit to Israel.  After the show's most successful season ever, Gene Simmons Family Jewels returned for its seventh season on Monday, May 28, 2012, with a special one-hour premiere. In August 2012, A&E announced the seventh season would be the last, and Simmons added that he would not shop the series to other networks and, instead, will focus on the Kiss tour and other business commitments.

Episodes

Series overview

Season 1 (2006)

Season 2 (2007)

Season 3 (2008)

Season 4 (2009)

Season 5 (2010–11)

Season 6 (2011)

Season 7 (2012)

See also 

 The Osbournes (2002)
 Hogan Knows Best (2005)
 Rock of Love with Bret Michaels (2007)

References 

General references that apply to most episodes

External links 
 
 
 Press release announcing the series

2000s American reality television series
2006 American television series debuts
2010s American reality television series
2012 American television series endings
A&E (TV network) original programming
English-language television shows
Kiss (band)
Television shows set in the United States